Samobor is a city in Zagreb County, Croatia. It is part of the Zagreb metropolitan area. Administratively it is a part of Zagreb County.

Geography
Samobor is located west of Zagreb, between the eastern slopes of the Samobor hills, the eastern part of Žumberak Mountains, in the Sava River valley. It is part of the historical region of Croatia proper.

Administration
The city government, court, police, health service, and a post office are part of the Samobor infrastructure.

History

Samobor has existed as a free royal town since 1242, according to a document of endowment by King Béla IV.

Since the Treaty of Karlowitz in 1699, Szamobor was part of the Habsburg monarchy, (Transleithania after the compromise of 1867), and soon after in the Kingdom of Croatia-Slavonia, created when the Kingdom of Slavonia and the Kingdom of Croatia were merged in 1868. In the late 19th and early 20th century, Samobor was a district capital in the Zagreb County of the Kingdom of Croatia-Slavonia.

Economy
One of the chief industries in Samobor is crystal cutting, acclaimed in Europe and all over the world.

Notable people
Many well-known people were born or lived in Samobor. Such notable personalities are:

 Mihalj Šilobod Bolšić (1724–1787), Roman Catholic priest, mathematician, writer, and musical theorist primarily known for writing the first Croatian arithmetic textbook Arithmatika Horvatzka (published in Zagreb, 1758)
 Tvrtko Kale (born 1974), Croatian-Israeli footballer
 Ferdo Livadić, a prominent member of the nationalist Illyrian movement in the 19th century, piano composer and writer of the most famous Croatian patriotic song of the 19th century, Još Hrvatska ni propala
 Antun Gustav Matoš, poet and writer, lived in Samobor for four years
 Antonio Šančić, tennis player
 Dejan Jović, political scientist
 Slađan Ašanin, football player

Population

In the 2021 Croatian census, the total population of the administrative territory of Samobor was 37,481, distributed in the following settlements:

Settlements

 Beder, population 68
 Bobovica, population 258
 Braslovje, population 303
 Bratelji, population 11
 Bregana, population 2,207
 Breganica, population 59
 Brezovac Žumberački, population 20
 Budinjak, population 10
 Bukovje Podvrško, population 25
 Celine Samoborske, population 327
 Cerje Samoborsko, population 339
 Cerovica, population 4
 Dane, population 7
 Dolec Podokićki, population 77
 Domaslovec, population 900
 Draganje Selo, population 77
 Dragonoš, population 13
 Drežnik Podokićki, population 246
 Dubrava Samoborska, population 248
 Falašćak, population 108
 Farkaševec Samoborski, population 467
 Galgovo, population 699
 Golubići, population 6
 Gornja Vas, population 22
 Gradna, population 542
 Grdanjci, population 320
 Gregurić Breg, population 106
 Hrastina Samoborska, population 852
 Jarušje, population 47
 Javorek, population 39
 Kladje, population 892
 Klake, population 230
 Klokočevec Samoborski, population 326
 Konšćica, population 267
 Kostanjevec Podvrški, population 69
 Kotari, population 74
 Kravljak, population 2
 Lug Samoborski, population 946
 Mala Jazbina, population 489
 Mala Rakovica, population 609
 Mali Lipovec, population 110
 Manja Vas, population 76
 Medsave, population 205
 Molvice, population 666
 Noršić Selo, population 90
 Novo Selo Žumberačko, population 18
 Osredek Žumberački, population 13
 Osunja, population 7
 Otruševec, population 295
 Pavučnjak, population 515
 Petkov Breg, population 256
 Podgrađe Podokićko, population 137
 Podvrh, population 520
 Poklek, population 20
 Prekrižje Plešivičko, population 16
 Rakov Potok, population 1,093
 Rude, population 1,085
 Samobor, population 16,914
 Samoborski Otok, population 612
 Savršćak, population 214
 Selce Žumberačko, population 3
 Sječevac, population 8
 Slani Dol, population 171
 Slapnica, population 11
 Slavagora, population 72
 Smerovišće, population 108
 Stojdraga, population 48
 Sveti Martin pod Okićem, population 256
 Šimraki, population 5
 Šipački Breg, population 33
 Tisovac Žumberački, population 0
 Velika Jazbina, population 263
 Velika Rakovica, population 507
 Veliki Lipovec, population 73
 Višnjevec Podvrški, population 30
 Vratnik Samoborski, population 93
 Vrbovec Samoborski, population 262
 Vrhovčak, population 365

Monuments and sightseeings

Samobor is one of the earliest tourist resorts in the region, with the first tourist facilities dating back to 1810, catering to anglers, hunters and hikers. The town's beautiful surroundings and vicinity to the capital have supported this tourist tradition to the present day. In 1846, Samobor was paid a visit by the composer Franz Liszt, who at that time was visiting Zagreb during one of his numerous concert tours. Liszt came to Samobor to see his friend Ferdo Livadić, in his lodgings at the   Livadić mansion, which is today the town museum.
At the beginning of the 20th century, the Livadić mansion came under the ownership of a Jewish family named Daničić. They were forced to leave as a result of the Nazi invasion in 1941. Shortly after this, the mansion was
confiscated by the newly formed Independent State of Croatia and never returned to the Daničić family. On Tepec hill, a 10-minute walk from the city centre, there are still-visible remains of the Samobor Castle fortress built in the 13th century.

Education
There are two elementary schools and one high school in Samobor:
 Osnovna škola Bogumil Toni
 Osnovna škola Samobor(formerly Osnovna škola Janko Mišić)
 Srednja škola Samobor, consisting of two academies teaching arts such as economy and trade; the Gimnazija Antuna Gustava Matoša;
and the Srednja strukovna škola Samobor – with technical studies, hairdressing, etc.

There is also a music academy – Glazbena škola Ferdo Livadić.

Sport

The main local football club is NK Samobor, who play in the Treća HNL.
Other football clubs are NK Bregana, NK Galgovo, NK Klokočevac, NK Rakov Potok, NK Samoborski Otok, NK Zrinski Farkaševac.
The local woman's handball club is ŽRK Samobor, who play in the Prva HRL.
The local men's handball clubs are RK Mladost 09, and RK Rudar, who play in the Premijer liga.
The local men's basketball club is KK Samobor, who play in the Prva muška liga.
The local judo clubs are Judo Klub Samobor, and Judo Klub Profectus Samobor.
The local karate clubs are Karate klub Samobor, Karate klub Mladost and Karate klub Bregana.
The local athletics club is Atletski klub Samobor 2007.
The local gymnastics club Gimnastički klub Samobor.
The local volleyball club is Odbojkaški klub Samobor.
The local tennis club is Tenis klub Samobor 1890.
The local table tennis club is Stolnoteniski klub Samobor.
The local taekwondo club is Taekwondo klub Koryo Samobor.
The local mountain bike club is Brdsko-biciklistički klub Šišmiš.
The local kickboxing klub is TNT Samobor.
The local motocross club is Moto Cross Klub TRP Marović.

The main football ground is Gradski Stadion Samobor.
The main indoor sports hall is Sportska dvorana Samobor with the seating capacity of 700.
Other indoor sports halls are Sportska dvorana Bogumil Toni with seating capacity of 500, Sportska dvorana Rude with seating capacity of 300 and Sportska dvorana OŠ Samobor with no seating capacity.

International relations

Twin towns — Sister cities
Samobor is twinned with:

  Wirges, Germany
  Veles, North Macedonia
  Stari Grad, Croatia
  Pécs, Hungary
  Chassieu, France
  Parabiago, Italy

See also
 Zagreb County

References

External links

MyTravelStudio – Travel Blog

Cities and towns in Croatia
Populated places in Zagreb County
Zagreb County (former)
Tourist attractions in Zagreb County